Luis Guillermo Carbonetti (born 23 April 1953) is an Argentine professional golfer. He is the brother of golfer Horacio Carbonetti.

Carbonetti was born in Río Cuarto, Córdoba. As an amateur, he played on five Eisenhower Trophy teams and won the individual title twice (1982 and 1984). He turned pro in 1984.

Carbonetti won the Argentine Tour Order of Merit in 1985 and Cordoba Tour Order of Merit 2002. He also played on the European Tour in the 1980s and 1990s. His best finishes on tour were a pair of T-7 in 1989 at the Lancia Italian Open and Torras Monte Carlo Open.

Carbonetti played on the U.S.-based Champions Tour in 2003 and is now a member of the European Seniors Tour and has three victories on this tour.

Amateur wins
 1972 Jockey Club Rosario Open
 1975 Amateur Argentine Open
 1976 Center Open, Viña del Mar Open (Chile)
 1977 Rio Cuarto Open, Parana Open, Golden Cup Jujuy, Argentine Masters, Gordon Kenneth Cup
 1978 Porto Alegre Open (Brazil), Uruguay Open, Center Open, El Rincon Grand Prix (Colombia), North Open
 1979 San Isidro Grand Prix, Los Lagartos Grand Prix, Livramento Grand Prix (Brazil)
 1980 Abierto del Litoral, Center Open, Uruguay Open, Jockey Club Rosario Open
 1981 Center Open, Amateur Dutch Open
 1982 Acantilados Grand Prix, Center Open, Golden Cup Jujuy, Las Americas Tournament (USA), Rio Cuarto Open, Eisenhower Trophy (individual), Bucaramanga Open (Colombia)
 1983 San Andres Grand Prix, Rio Cuarto Open, Center Open, Bucaramanga Open (Colombia), Amateur Argentine Open, Amateur Colombian Open, Jockey Club Rosario Open
 1984 Acantilados Grand Prix, South Open, North Open, Eisenhower Trophy (individual), Argentine National Championship, Ford Taunus Grand Prix, Ituzaingo Grand Prix

Professional wins (28)

Argentine wins (15)
 1982 Golden Cup Jujuy (as amateur)
 1983 Center Open (as amateur), Miramar Grand Prix (as amateur)
 1985 Punta del Este Open (Uruguay), Center Open, Rio Cuarto Open, North Open
 1986 Center Open
 1989 Punta del Este Open (Uruguay), Praderas Grand Prix
 1992 Smithfield Country Club Grand Prix, Nautico Escobar Club Grand Prix
 1993 Abierto del Litoral, Pacheco Club Grand Prix
 2000 North Open

Cordoba Tour wins (2)
 2002 Jockey Club Cordoba Tournament, Ascochigas Club Tournament

Other wins (5)
 1978 San Pablo Open (Brazil) (as amateur)
 1987 Ciudad del Este Open (Paraguay), 1987 Swesish Challenge
 1990 Santo Domingo Open (Chile)
 1996 Callaway Cup (Argentine), Brahma Challenge (Argentine)

European Senior Tour wins (3)

European Senior Tour playoff record (1–0)

Other senior wins (3)
 2004 Acantilados Senior Grand Prix, Punta del Este Senior Open (Uruguay), Cadillac Senior Classic (USA)

Team appearances
Amateur
 Eisenhower Trophy (representing Argentina): 1976, 1978, 1980, 1982 (individual leader), 1984 (individual leader, tie)
 South American Cup (Los Andes Cup): 1975, 1976 (winner), 1977 (winner), 1978 (winner), 1981 (winner), 1982, 1983, 1984 (winner)
 Vigil Cup (Argentine): 1975 (winner), 1976 (winner), 1977 (winner), 1979, 1980, 1984 (individual winner)

Professional
 World Cup (representing Argentina): 1990, 1993

External links

Argentine male golfers
European Tour golfers
PGA Tour Champions golfers
European Senior Tour golfers
Sportspeople from Córdoba Province, Argentina
People from Río Cuarto, Córdoba
1953 births
Living people